İstanbullu Gelin (Bride of Istanbul) is a 2017 Turkish television series signed by O3 Medya. The first episode was broadcast on March 3, 2017, directed by Zeynep Günay Tan and Deniz Koloş .The final episode aired on May 31, 2019. It is adapted from Dr. Gülseren Budayıcıoğlu's book Hayata Dön (Return to Life).

Plot 
Süreyya, a young and beautiful but financially strapped singer, is courted by Faruk Boran, the eldest son of the Boran family, which has deep roots in Bursa, a historically important city in Turkey. The Boran family, one of the most prominent and successful in Bursa, is in the transportation industry. Faruk's mother, the matriarch of the family, wants Faruk to marry Ipek,  the daughter of a friend of the family, and a clash of wills between the two ensues. Many family secrets come tumbling out.

In the second season, the Boran family lose their home, their inheritance and are faced with the struggles of accepting their modest lifestyle.

In the third season they are going to face Adem and take back what is theirs.

Cast

Broadcast Schedule

Accolades

See also 
 List of programs broadcast by Star TV

References

External links 
 

Turkish drama television series
2017 Turkish television series debuts
Star TV (Turkey) original programming
Turkish-language television shows
Television shows set in Istanbul